Holbeach Drove is a village in the South Holland district of Lincolnshire, England.

The village church is dedicated to St Polycarp. There is one local public house, the Golden Ball, and a shop-cum-petrol station.

External links

Villages in Lincolnshire
Holbeach